Pain psychology is the study of psychological and behavioral processes in chronic pain. Pain psychology involves the implementation of treatments for chronic pain. Pain psychology can also be regarded as a branch of medical psychology, as many conditions associated with chronic pain have significant medical outcomes. Untreated pain or ineffective treatment of pain can result in symptoms of anxiety, depression, and suicidal thoughts, thus it is vital that appropriate pain management occur in a timely fashion following symptom onset.

Mental health-related difficulties can arise as a result of pain, or can pre-exist and worsen during the course of chronic pain, thus causing one to seek out or be referred by the patient’s healthcare provider for pain-relief treatment. Pain psychology aims to treat the person in pain rather than strictly the pain itself. A pain psychologist’s job is to work with the mental health issues that can be feeding into the physical pain that the patient is experiencing, and help them manage and reduce the effect it has on their lives.

Introduction 
Pain is one of the most common sensations for which individuals seek medical attention.  Pain is an uncomfortable physical sensation that may manifest with different presentations. Coping with intense forms of pain can lead to psychological feelings like depression, anxiety, and stress.

Treatments 
Pain treatments include a host of therapeutic techniques and methods such as active listening, medication, reflection, empathy as well as behavioral techniques like guided imagery or meditation. A common treatment for pain is psychotherapy also known as talk therapy. It has helped reduce patients’ pain, increased the contentment of their lives, and has lowered the pain medication intake. An example of this presents itself in a study that was conducted on a group of workers in 1998 with chronic pain issues, and once they went through psychotherapy treatment, it resulted in decreased levels of depression and other conflicts, along with better control of their lives. What is learned from the therapy sessions can become useful tools for patients to use for future conflicts with chronic pain due to injury and/or a surgical procedure.

Pain Psychologist vs Physician 
Individuals experiencing chronic pain typically contact a physician first. A physician is able to provide a prescription to medications to treat chronic pain. The medications commonly prescribed are acetaminophen, topical creams/sprays (applied to the skin) that contain pain relievers, opioids (narcotics), sedatives to help with insomnia, and medical marijuana. These medications are temporary pain relievers that are highly addictive therefore, it is common for a physician to recommend a pain psychologist. A pain psychologist will help you address the mental effects that chronic pain causes. According to the American Psychological Association (APA), when a chronic pain patient goes in for treatment from a pain psychologist, they are asked various questions about their mental and physical health, their concerns about the pain they are experiencing, and a questionnaire may follow to keep track of any other information that may be needed to take note of. Once this initial process is done, a treatment plan is made specifically to meet the needs of the patient. Pain psychologist offer various mental therapies that include cognitive-behavioral therapy (CBT) acceptance and commitment therapy, mindfulness training, meditation and relaxation therapies. To look at the therapies offered by a pain psychologist more in-depth, Practical Pain Management.com’s The Role of Psychology in Pain Management article lists the many treatments associated with CBT:

 Biofeedback and relaxation training (e.g., diaphragmatic breathing, progressive muscle relaxation, autogenic training, self-hypnosis, guided visual imagery) to reduce muscle tension and promote the body’s calming response
 General stress management techniques (e.g., time management, problem-solving skills, assertive communication)
 Health promotion (e.g., nutrition and exercise, sleep hygiene)
 Anger management skills training
 Increasing understanding of personality style and its contribution to the pain experience
 Activity pacing and reducing fear of pain and/or activity avoidance
 Increasing acceptance of the chronic nature of pain condition
 Reinforcement (i.e., “operant”) techniques to increase adaptive behaviors and decrease maladaptive pain behaviors
 Cognitive approaches to manage clinical depression and anxiety disorders
 Cognitive approaches to foster thoughts, emotions and actions that are adaptive for managing a life with pain

The longevity of seeking pain psychotherapy varies from patient to patient. Some who are experiencing severe psychological issues alongside their medical issues may need to stay in therapy for a little bit longer. It is up to the patient and the psychologist to discuss how extensive the treatment needs to be. 
 Pain management
 Psychogenic pain
 Pain Catastrophizing Scale

Prevention 
Chronic pain is a public health problem that is difficult and costly to treat. Chronic pain can be induced from nerve damage, injury, and even repeated strain. There are very few findings on prevention of chronic pain. Treatment in acute pain can prevent chronic pain from developing. Many prevention studies suggest oral medications between 1 hour and 1 day prior to surgery. Other studies suggests that pain can be managed through dieting. A diet of anti-inflammatory foods supports chronic pain management.

References

External links 
 Science Advances in Pain Research
 How psychologists can help with pain management
 The Psychology of Pain

Clinical psychology
Pain management